Hurlstone Agricultural High School (HAHS, colloquially as Hurlstone Ag) is a government-funded co-educational academically selective and specialist secondary day and boarding school, located in Glenfield, a south-western suburb of Sydney, in the Macarthur region of New South Wales, Australia. HAHS is the oldest government boarding school in New South Wales.

Farrer Memorial Agricultural High School, Yanco Agricultural High School and Hurlstone Agricultural High School are the state's only public selective and agricultural schools that also include a co-educational boarding school. The  Hurlstone Agricultural campus includes classroom blocks, an operational farm, sporting facilities and student accommodation.

Hurlstone was named the Macarthur region's best academic school, ranking 11th in the NSW top 200 list for the 2012 academic year.  The school had 148 distinguished achievers, 13 on the state's top achievers' list, eight on the all-rounders' list and three students who topped the state in a course. Students are required to sit the Selective High Schools Test in Year 6 to be granted enrolment into the school. The allowance mark is usually between 205 and 215 in the Selective test (out of 300). Students can also gain entrance by sitting a similar exam in other grades.

History 

Hurlstone was established as a boys-only school in 1907 in Hurlstone Park, approximately ten kilometres south west of Sydney, at the present site of Trinity Grammar School. The original owner of the land was a teacher, John Kinloch, one of the first graduates of the University of Sydney. He named the land 'Hurlstone Estate', after his mother's maiden name and set up his own school on it in 1878 which he called the Hurlstone School and College.

In those days most students completed their schooling after primary school and students at 'Hurlstone Agricultural Continuation School' (as it was known at the time) studied there for only two years. In 1926 the school moved to its present site in Glenfield, approximately 42 km south-west of Sydney (between Liverpool and Campbelltown) and adjacent to Glenfield railway station. By then its student numbers had grown from 30 in 1907, to 148. The school supported government policy to promote productivity in the agricultural sector through the training of boys in all aspects of agricultural sciences and farm management.

For a brief period in the early 1940s it was known as 'Macarthur Agricultural High School' in honour of wool-grower John Macarthur, but it soon reverted to its previous name.

Hurlstone was a boys' school until 1979, when the decision was made to become co-educational.

In 2008, the New South Wales Government declared 140 hectares of Hurlstone's farmland 'surplus' and proposed the sale of the land, leaving the school with just 20 hectares. The announcement was met with immediate public protest and the formation of a local community group Save Hurlstone Educational and Agricultural Property (SHEAP) eventuating in a government inquiry into the proposed sale and proceeds of the sale. There was further pressure against the plans when the National Trust heritage listed the school in late 2009. The government inquiry resulted in a recommendation of the sale of a small parcel of school land with the proceeds intended to help upgrade school facilities.

On 18 November 2015, there was another proposal to sell the land the school and its farm operated on.

Principals

The following individuals have served as principal of the Hurlstone Agricultural High School:

Population 

Enrolment at the school is dependent on selective examinations of Year 6 students from across the state. New students coming in later grades have to sit a similar exam.

The student population of about 975 is divided between boarder students (who reside on the school grounds and originate mainly from country NSW), and day students (who commute mostly from the south western Sydney region). The boarder-day student ratio is roughly 1:8. For sporting and accommodation purposes the school is divided into four houses: Farrer (red), Macarthur (yellow), Wentworth (blue) and Lachlan Macquarie (green).

Campus

Hurlstone Agricultural High School is located on a single campus, covering the area from Glenfield railway station, along Roy Watts Road and extending to sections of Quarter Sessions Road near the Hume Highway. Glenfield station is serviced by the T8 Airport & South Line, the T5 Cumberland Line and the T2 Inner West & Leppington Line.

The school has several enclaves, including the Department of Education regional office. It also has several specialty schools, Ajuga School, Glenfield Park School and Campbell House School. Ajuga School supports students from K-12 with a complex trauma background and/or Autism Spectrum Disorder and supporting students to transition back into their mainstream 'census' school. Campbell House is for students with behavioural issues that cannot go to their local school (usually due to expulsion) while Glenfield Park is for students with intellectual disability and emotional disturbance.

Hurlstone features a fully functional farm and a commercial dairy. Animals on the farm include: beef and dairy cattle, sheep, horses, pigs, and chickens. Alpacas, peacocks, goats and bees were also formerly farmed.

The school's swimming pool is located adjacent to the boarding school, and was used for swimming carnivals, school sports and recreational purposes. Towards the end of 2012, the pool was closed down due to hygiene issues and cracks along the pool. Plans to rebuild the pool have been considered but no construction has started. It is currently assumed that the pool will never be repaired, due to the fact that the land on which it sits will no longer be a part of the new Roy Watts school after Hurlstone moves. However, in December 2019, the plan to move Hurlstone was cancelled.

The boarding school has modern facilities, where boarders can sleep, study, exercise and socialise. Facilities include a well-being center, cardio rooms, spacious dining hall, a lecture theatre, a common room and private dormitories. The day school also have facilities including classrooms, toilets, an oval, football fields, careers office, music rooms, the John Edmondson hall, Covered Outdoor Learning Area, computer rooms, technology rooms, science labs, dance studio, horticulture area, volleyball court, tennis courts, cricket nets and the Stanley Cook Memorial Library.

Clarke House is a heritage listed building which houses Hurlstone's memorabilia museum.

The school also hosts a memorial forest and cairn on Roy Watts Road, past the boarding school. Established in 1950, it is believed to be Australia's first living war memorial, with a gum tree dedicated to each of the 600 students from the school who served in WWI and II. Currently, ANZAC and Remembrance Day ceremonies are held at the memorial forest.

As part of the 2008 mini-budget, the New South Wales Government declared 140 hectares of the school to be surplus to educational needs and the land will be sold in 2011. However, due to a strong public protest against this action, an inquiry was led into process of selling approximately seven-eighths of the school. As a result, Mal Peters, the Inquiry Chair, recommended the school's agricultural sector to be upgraded in order to reflect current industry practice and standards due to it being an economic, wise and important public investment for the people of NSW as it supplies young scientists with the knowledge for the ever declining, but demanding agricultural sector of the world.

In 2020 a new school called Hurlstone Agricultural High School was to open at Western Sydney University, Hawkesbury. The existing school in Glenfield would be renamed Roy Watts High School (after Hurlstone alumnus Roy Watts) and would remain fully selective but would no longer be an agricultural school. However, this decision was cancelled in December 2019. The farm land would have been converted to a new public school as well as housing and a shopping centre.

Extracurricular activities 
The school provides opportunities for students to engage in both co-curricular and extracurricular activities. Students may participate in certain clubs which promote these activities. Some groups are unique when compared to public schools within the district, such as the Cadet corps, Interact and Rural Youth. Hurlstone's Interact Club is the largest student run Interact in the Southern Hemisphere. Sport is an important part of extracurricular life at Hurlstone.
Hurlstone also participates in the Law Society of NSW's Mock Trial competition. The 2011 team came 2nd in the competition.

Other extracurricular activities at the school include the Student Leadership Team (previously known as 'The Prefects'), School SRC, Environment Committee, Debating, public speaking, Boarder Council, Pops Orchestra, Ensemble, Choir, Hurlstone (Health) Youth, Interact Club, EMPOWER (Social Justice), Literature Club and EPIC (Entertainment and Performing Arts Integrated Community). These groups help to improve the school in a number of ways from the environment to the entertainment sector.

Notable alumni

Education 
 Tim Soutphommasane - Research Fellow in the National Centre of Australian Studies at Monash University in Melbourne and a senior project leader with the Per Capita think tank. He has also held the position of Race Discrimination Commissioner at the Australian Human Rights Commission since 2013
 Alan O. Trounson (1958 - 1962) - biologist, stem cell researcher and IVF pioneer

Entertainment, community, media and the arts 
Toby Allen - singer for band Human Nature
Phil Burton - singer for band Human Nature
Robert F. Cranny - ARIA award-winning music producer and songwriter
Peter Moore - author
Dan O'Connor - Top 12 of 2004 Australian Idol and actor
Kate Ritchie - actress and Radio Personality
Andrew Tierney - singer for band Human Nature
Michael Tierney - singer for band Human Nature
Subby Valentine - comedian

Military 
 Mark Binskin - Chief of the Defence Force (CDF) Australia.
John Hurst Edmondson  - soldier in World War II; the Hurlstone school hall is named in his honour
 Sir William Keys  - National Secretary of RSL

Politics, public service and the law 
John Kerin - politician, former Treasurer of Australia
Mark Latham - politician, former Leader of the Australian Labor Party
 Dick Klugman, Member for federal seat of Prospect 1969 - 1990, Co-founder of NSW Council for Civil Liberties;
Jim Lees - former Commissioner of the New South Wales Police
Clinton Mead - politician, Mayor of Campbelltown, New South Wales
Amanda Stoker - former Senator for Queensland 2018 - 2022

Sport 
 Scott Kneller - Freestyle Skier and competed in the 2010 Vancouver Winter Olympics
 David Lyons - rugby union player, Wallabies
 Cec Ramalli - Wallaby
 Paul Reid - football player, Socceroos
 John Taylor - rugby union player, Wallabies

Agriculture 
 David Lowe - winemaker & owner, Lowe Wines, President NSW Wine Industry, Vice President Australian Winemakers Federation
 Charles Melton - winemaker

See also 

 List of Government schools in New South Wales
 List of selective high schools in New South Wales
 List of boarding schools in Australia

References

External links 
 

Agricultural schools
Educational institutions established in 1907
Boarding schools in New South Wales
Selective schools in New South Wales
Public high schools in Sydney
1907 establishments in Australia
Glenfield, New South Wales
Macarthur (New South Wales)